The Biodynamic Federation Demeter International is the largest certification organization for biodynamic agriculture, and is one of three predominant organic certifiers. Its name is a reference to Demeter, the Greek goddess of grain and fertility. It is a non-profit umbrella organisation with 46 members organisations in 36 countries around the world, representing both the global biodynamic movement and the Demeter certified biodynamic farms. The organization incorporates 19 certifying Demeter organizations, and the rest of the certification is done by the international certification committee. The Demeter Biodynamic Certification is used in over 65 countries to verify that biodynamic products meet international standards in production and processing. The Demeter symbol was introduced and registered as a trademark in 1928, and as such was the first ecological label for organically produced foods.

Description 
Certification is difficult to come by and must be renewed annually. Demeter’s “biodynamic” certification requires biodiversity and ecosystem preservation, soil husbandry, livestock integration, prohibition of genetically engineered organisms and viewing the farm as a living “holistic organism”. The certification verifies the fulfillment of the standards on behalf of the farmers, which in turn guarantees high quality food products to the consumers. This is rewarded by receiving a higher price for food certified with the “Demeter” label, ranging from 10-30% on average.

History 

The origin of Demeter is a Cooperative for the processing of products of the biodynamic agriculture created in Berlin, Germany, in 1927. The trademark Demeter was registered in 1928. Demeter was administered by the German agronomist Erhard Bartsch who also directed the Experimental Circle of anthroposophical (biodynamic) farmers, and who had chosen the name Demeter, jointly with the German chemist Franz Dreidax. Dreidax was responsible for the development of the Demeter criteria and the quality control.

The Demeter name was adopted internationally. In Australia, two members of the Experimental Circle, Ernesto Genoni and Ileen Macpherson founded Demeter Biological Farm in Melbourne in 1934 and operated it as a biodynamic farm for two decades (until 1954).

See also
 Organic certification

References

External links

Agricultural organisations based in Germany
Anthroposophy
Organic food certification organizations
Product certification
Deutscher Naturschutzring